Awam is a  1987 Indian Hindi-language action drama film directed and produced by B. R. Chopra. The film stars Ashok Kumar, Rajesh Khanna, Raj Babbar, Smita Patil, Poonam Dhillon, Nana Patekar, Shafi Inamdar in pivotal roles.

Plot
Captain Amar Kumar of the Indian army lives with his father, Ram, and mother, Saraswati. Ram has been associated with top freedom fighters during India's struggle for independence from the British. Almost all of these freedom fighters had taken advantage of their involvement and have taken up important positions in India's administration, and these include Jagrathan and Mohanlal, while others like Vaisakh Ansari and Ram have chosen not to. Amar goes to Delhi and meets Mohanlal, who offers him the position of personal secretary with Jagrathan. Then a chain of events leads to the death of Jagrathan's pilot son, Surender, resulting in Jagrathan threatening to expose the powers-that-be unless they come clean and admit their involvement. Then Jagrathan is killed in a vehicle accident. Before dying, he asks Dr. Shabnam to hand over a key to Amar. Before Shabnam could do so, she is attacked by two unknown men, and wounded. Together with Amar and Rafiq Sayed Jaffrey, they locate the key - but do not know where to locate the lock. Then Shabnam is attacked again, but Amar rescues her. Amar's world is turned upside down when he is accused of treason, court-martialed, and dishonorably discharged from the army. Disillusioned by this, he decides to join the very forces that are involved in treason. And when he does he finds out that he is not amongst strangers at all.

Cast

Ashok Kumar as Vehshat Ansari
Rajesh Khanna as Captain Amar Kumar
Raj Babbar as Rafiq Jaffrey
Smita Patil as Dr. Shabnam
Poonam Dhillon as Sushma
Nana Patekar as Colonel Mustafa Ali Zahidi
Vijay Arora as Thakur Suryabhan Singh
Shafi Inamdar as Mohanlal
Iftekhar as Ram Kumar
Ashalata Wabgaonkar as Saraswati
Shreeram Lagoo as Minister / Lawyer
Om Shivpuri as Jagratan
Sushma Seth as Durga 
Deepak Parashar as Surendra
Satish Shah as Triloki Prasad "T.P."
Rajesh Puri as Taxi Driver Baldev Singh
Saeed Jaffrey as Defence Lawyer
Dalip Tahil as Army Officer
Dan Dhanoa as Dayal
Puneet Issar as Dayal's Associate
Arun Bakshi as Air Chief Marshall Vasudevan
Gufi Paintal as Mr. Agarwal
Huma Khan as Mrs. Suryabhan Singh
Manisha Kohli as Princess Saloni

Soundtrack

References

External links

1987 films
1980s Hindi-language films
Films directed by B. R. Chopra
Fictional portrayals of police departments in India
Films scored by Ravi
1980s political drama films
Indian political drama films